Grevillea quercifolia, commonly known as the oak-leaf grevillea, is a species of flowering plant in the protea family and is endemic to the southwest of Western Australia. It is a straggly to sprawling shrub usually with pinnatifid or serrated leaves, and oval to cylindrical clusters of pale to deep pink flowers.

Description

Taxonomy
Grevillea quercifolia was first formally described in 1830 by Robert Brown in his Supplementum primum prodromi florae Novae Hollandiae. The specific epithet (quercifolia) means "oak-leaved".

Distribution and habitat
Oak-leaved grevillea is widespread in the south-west of Western Australia, where it grows in heathland, shrubland or woodland from a little north of Perth to Augusta and east to Mount Barker and Albany in the Jarrah Forest, Swan Coastal Plain and Warren bioregions of south-western Western Australia.

Conservation status
This grevillea is listed as "not threatened" by the Government of Western Australia Department of Biodiversity, Conservation and Attractions.

References

quercifolia
Endemic flora of Western Australia
Eudicots of Western Australia
Proteales of Australia
Taxa named by Robert Brown (botanist, born 1773)
Plants described in 1830